Alliott Global Alliance is an alliance of independent professional services firms including accounting firms, law firms, audit firms and other specialist services providers. The association was established in 1979 and comprises 194 member firms in 230 cities across 80 countries.

Member firms are independent, mid-market professional practices.

History

Origins

The original founding firms already had working relationships and mutual clients but established a formal association in Alliott Peirson International, Alliott Global Alliance’s forerunner, in 1979. The association’s aim was to meet the needs more efficiently of those clients that needed assistance when expanding into or facing challenges in different jurisdictions around the world. As client demand for services in new locations grew, member firms were (and continue to be) appointed in key commercial cities across the world.

Multidisciplinary expansion
According to Inside Public Accounting, "Alliott Global Alliance was one of the first international groups to adopt an interdisciplinary approach." The association opened its membership to law firms in 2004. As a result, Alliott Global Alliance may be listed as an international law firm network or as one of a small number of Multidisciplinary professional services networks.

References 

1979 establishments in the United Kingdom